Ty Pak (born Tae-Yong Pak in 1938) is a writer and speaker on Korean/Asian American affairs and literature.

Biography

Born in Korea shortly before World War II, Pak witnessed Japanese colonial rule, Korea's liberation from Japan in 1945, its division during subsequent U.S. and Soviet occupation, and the trauma of the Korean War in his early childhood and adolescent years, receiving his law degree from Seoul National University in 1961. In 1957 he started working as a reporter for The Stars and Stripes, and in 1958 for the Korean English dailies The Korean Republic and The Korea Times, until 1965 when he emigrated to the United States.

After earning his Ph.D. in English from Bowling Green State University, Ohio, in 1969 he taught in the English Department at the University of Hawaii from 1970 to 1987. His first collection of short stories, Guilt Payment (1983), has been used as a textbook at many US colleges. His other books include Moonbay (1999), in the UCLA English syllabus, Cry Korea Cry (1999), A Korean Decameron (1961, reissued 2019), Dear Daughter: On the Eve of Her Wedding (2018), The Polyglot: Union of Korea and Japan (2018), serialized in English and Korean by the Korean New York Ilbo Daily from Jun 1, 2019 through Jun 5, 2021, The SEE Creed: Sex Equality and Emancipation (2021), which champions the matronymic surnaming of children to alternate with the patronymic, The Global Federalist Manifesto (2021), a pamphlet urging all sovereign states to surrender their sovereignty, a toxic relic, to the United States of the World, and Lucy Wong, the Guardian Angel for the USW: United States of the World (2022), a novella where Lucy Wong turns out to be Xi Jinping's daughter.

Reviews

In a review of Guilt Payment (Amerasia Journal (1984),160-162) S. E. Solberg, University of Washington, praises Pak's stories which, "better than any others written by a Korean American," confront "the voids and wounds, both psychic and physical, that drive and inhibit a generation of Koreans born to division, war and a homeland that is not whole either," noting their "tight plots [that] move the reader forward with the urge of the adventure tale, then bring him up short with an ironic twist of action or situation."

Basing her study, (Mis)interpretations and (In)justice: The 1992 Los Angeles "Riots" and "Black-Korean Conflict, MELUS (Multi-Ethnic Literature of the United States), Oxford Journals, Vol. 30, No. 3, Fall 2005, pp. 3-40, on an extensive analysis of Ty Pak’s “The Court Interpreter” in Moonbay, King-Kok Cheung, UCLA, finds the story “both illuminating and troubling, especially in its depiction of the tension between blacks and Koreans,” which along with the acquittal of white policemen for beating Rodney King leads to the 1992 Los Angeles Riots. As well as an Aristotelian tragedy, the hero overthrown by his hubris, the story is seen as a fictional confirmation of the “divide and conquer” scheme inherent in the white-dominant American social structure, the narrator observing that during jury selection both the prosecution and the defense are intent on eliminating those who belong to the race of the opposite party: “The last survivors were. . . all white, Anglo white” (101). It dawns on him that “this was the secret of white success in the US. By default, because the minorities could not trust each other.”

Announcing Moonbay and Cry Korea Cry, Publishers Weekly (May 17, 1999) praises “the coolly unruffled prose of Pak’s first-person narrators [that] suits the ironies they confront as they explore the dilemmas of Korea-American history, memory, “national reputation,” migration, survival and pride.” (June)

Writing in The Honolulu Advertiser (June 26, 1999) Charene Luke calls Cry Korea Cry "a noteworthy novel that is uniquely Korean," that portrays a mixed-blood Korean War orphan, who names himself Moo Moo, literally "Nothing Nothing," not a whole lot better than Chun Dong, "Wretched Kid," he grows up with in an orphanage, "ironically named the Mercy Home," run by a biased beast of a director, who makes him believe that he is the unwanted byproduct of a hungry Korean prostitute and a sex-starved American soldier. Luke reasons, "It is this very lack of acceptance ... that propels Chundong to survive, seize unlikely opportunities and take on the world... beginning with his first escape," which leads to his ancestry closely tied to the history of modern Korea, annexation to Japan, liberation, division, war, and dispersion. Amidst despair and sorrow over the tragedies that have devastated his entire family, and anger and contempt for the inane fratricidal hostility still continuing between North and South Korea, Moo rejects identification with either side and chooses to live in the US, making films dedicated to the validation of many lives wasted and lost, the fate of a displaced people wandering the globe in search of home and sustenance.

Luke notes "Pak’s cynical writing style [that] paints a convincing picture of the corrupt inner workings of the Korean governments and the unfairness and pretense that govern citizens’ day-to-day lives." Quoted is Moo's remark on the Korean folk musicians he associates with at one point: “How strange a community, always on the brink of falling apart but somehow holding together. Never in my life had I seen a more closely-knit society of enemies.”

Korea is described as “a sly backhand artist rather than the gentleman of the Far East victimized by superpower struggle.” Luke concludes: "The title Cry Korea Cry is fitting for the divided and internally scarred factions of North and South Korea."

In Magazine: Inside Asian America (Aug/Sept 1999) Peter Ong reviews Cry Korea Cry and praises the “astonishing vision and force [that] succeeds in conveying how human lives become expendable in the sinister politics of war. Pak’s brutal honesty about the human compulsion toward the darker elements of humanity offers us an unsettling, provocative window onto hard truths rather than satisfactory resolutions.”

In a review of The Polyglot in the Korean New York Daily (June 1, 2019) Paul Sharar, New York University, notes its "salient and imaginative storyline with its clearly drawn characters” on a global canvas as Korea wakes up to the modern age during the half-century, 1910~1960, beginning with its colonialization by Japan which drives millions of Koreans to Siberia only to be deported by Stalin in 1937 to Central Asia, a holocaust that only a fraction survives. Korea's liberation from Japan in 1945 at the end of WWII results in its division under American and Soviet occupation, which culminates in a 3-year mini-WWIII, wiping out a fifth of the population, which, however, revitalizes the Japanese economy as the sole offshore quartermaster for the US/UN Forces. 
"Throughout the evolving complexity of the story Peter, born in 1920 in Vladivostok and speaking 16 languages with native fluency due to his forced trials, is pushed into many different leadership roles ... before, during, and after the Korean War," states Sharar. "Then Peter’s identity is shattered, his old Soviet birth certificate turning out to be a fraud." 
Peter's patriotic poet father Bach assumed to have died in a Soviet gulag has been in the US, teaching literature at an American university, and is now comatose with renal failure after contacting Peter. The kidney transplant campaign to save him leads to the discovery of Peter's biological father, Seiji, a Japanese magnate and intellectual, who donates his kidney and saves Bach, his erstwhile adversary. 
"Hence the propriety of the eye-catching subtitle, Union of Korea and Japan," Sharar points out, "an improbable fantasy at first glance, given the history of the two countries." Not so with Peter, whose Korean and Japanese parentage is an embodiment of this union, especially in view of their common origins 10 millennia ago judging from the affinity of their two languages, as well as their close anatomy. 
"Ty Pak gets us to think beyond regional geopolitical expedients and look once again at the possibilities for our global community to bring nations, languages, and cultures together," concludes Sharar. "If Koreans and Japanese with their deep historical resentments will try, so might the rest of the world."

Selected publications

In addition to his numerous articles and reviews in Semiotica, Journal of Formal Logic, Language, and other academic journals, his fiction appears in the following anthologies:

"America, the Accursed?: The Dilemma of Korean Americans," Fides, (2021, Alum Journal of Seoul National University, Law College), Vol. 10, 160–70.

"Reflections as a Korean American Writer," Fides, (2020, Alum Journal of Seoul National University, Law College), Vol. 9, 146–159.

"Guilt Payment," Pow Wow (2009, Da Capo Press), 319–329.

"Exile," Honolulu Stories (2008, Mutual Publishing), 489–497.

"The Water Tower," Kori (2001, Beacon Press), 186–208.

"The Court Interpreter," LA Shorts (2000, Heyday Books), 239–257.

"The Tiger Cub," Amerasia Journal (1992, Vol. 18, #3), 51–60.

"Mercy Home," Amerasia Journal (1990, Vol 16, #1), 223–243.

"A Fire," Asian Pacific Literature (1981, State of Hawaii Department of Education), 443–450.

Books
 A Korean Decameron, 1961 (reprinted in 2019 by Bo-Leaf Books under a Harvard grant)
 Guilt Payment (short story collection), Bamboo Ridge Press, 1983, 
 Moonbay (short story collection), Woodhouse Inc, 1999
 Cry Korea Cry (novel), 1999, 
 Dear Daughter: On the Eve of Her Wedding, Amazon.com, 2018
 The Polyglot: Union of Korea and Japan, Amazon.com, 2018
 The SEE Creed: Sex Equality and Emancipation, Amazon.com, 2021
 The Global Federalist Manifesto, Amazon.com, 2021
 ''Lucy Wong, the Guardian Angel for the USW: United States of the World," amazon.com, 2022.

References

Living people
American writers of Korean descent
American academics of Korean descent
University of Hawaiʻi alumni
1938 births
American short story writers
South Korean emigrants to the United States
American male novelists
American novelists of Asian descent
Seoul National University School of Law alumni
Bowling Green State University alumni
University of Hawaiʻi at Mānoa faculty
American short story writers of Asian descent
American male short story writers